John Buller (1721–1786) was a British politician who sat in the House of Commons for 39 years from 1747 to 1786.
 
Buller was the son of John Francis Buller, M.P. and his wife Rebecca Trelawny, daughter of Sir Jonathan Trelawny, 3rd Baronet bishop of Winchester  and was born on  24 Jan. 1721. He matriculated at Balliol College, Oxford on 25 October 1738. He entered Middle Temple in 1740 and Inner Temple in 1743 and was called to the bar in February 1747. In 1746 he was  mayor of East Looe and in the 1747 general election  he was returned as Member of Parliament for East Looe.

In 1754  Buller was re-elected MP for East Looe and in the same year was appointed Comptroller of the Mint. He was also  mayor of East Looe again and appointed Recorder of East Looe in 1754. From 1759 to 1761 he was secretary to the Chancellor of the Exchequer. He married Mary St Aubyn, daughter of Sir John St Aubyn, 3rd Baronet on 3 March 1760.

Buller was re-elected MP for East Looe in 1761. He was mayor of West Looe by mandamus in 1763, and 1764. In  July 1765 he was Lord of the Admiralty, a post he held until September 1780. He was re-elected MP for East Looe in 1768. Following the death of his first wife in August 1767, he remarried to Elizabeth Caroline Hunter, daughter of John Hunter on 4 November 1768. He was again mayor of East Looe in 1772 and in the same year became auditor of the Duchy of Cornwall. He was returned again as MP for East Looe in 1774 and 1780 . He was Lord of the Treasury from September 1780 to March 1782 and again in December 1783. He was lastly returned as MP for East Looe in 1784.

Buller died on 26 July 1786.

References

1721 births
1786 deaths
Alumni of Balliol College, Oxford
Members of the Middle Temple
Members of the Inner Temple
Mayors of places in Cornwall
British MPs 1754–1761
British MPs 1761–1768
British MPs 1768–1774
British MPs 1774–1780
British MPs 1780–1784
British MPs 1784–1790
Members of the Parliament of Great Britain for English constituencies
Lords of the Admiralty
John, 1721